Trøgstad/Båstad Fotballklubb is a Norwegian association football club from Trøgstad, Østfold.

The men's football team currently plays in the Third Division, the fourth tier of Norwegian football. It last played in the Norwegian Second Division in 1999. Players in the 2000s include Toomas Tohver and Andrei Mazurkevitš.

It was originally a cooperation between the football departments of Trøgstad IL and Båstad IL, and they were merged to form their own club on 11 June 2001. Its home field is Trøgstad stadion, and its team colors are yellow and blue.

External links

 Official site 

Football clubs in Norway
Sport in Østfold
Association football clubs established in 2001
2001 establishments in Norway